Karahiya may refer to:

Karahiya, Lumbini, Nepal
Karaiya, Narayani, Nepal